Mexico–Poland relations are the bilateral relations between the United Mexican States and the Republic of Poland. Both nations are members of the Organisation for Economic Co-operation and Development and the United Nations.

History 
During Spanish colonization of Mexico from 1519 to 1810, any relations between New Spain and the Commonwealth of Poland would have been via Spain. After some time, while Mexico was obtaining its independence from Spain, Poland, by contrast, was finding itself being invaded and split among the Kingdom of Prussia, the Austro-Hungarian Empire and the Russian Empire. At the end of World War I and after the signing of the Treaty of Versailles, Poland obtained its independence once more.

In September 1921, Mexican President Alvaro Obregon recognized the national sovereignty of Poland. That same year, Polish Prince Albert Radziwill, who was head of the Polish Legation in Washington, D.C., United States, met with Mexican diplomats in the city, thus establishing the first official contact between the two nations. However, it was not until 26 February 1928 that diplomatic relations between the two countries were formally established. In 1930, Mexico and Poland signed a Treaty of Friendship, Commerce and Navigation and Mexico soon opened its first diplomatic legation in Warsaw. 

In the 1930s, diplomatic relations between the two nations became difficult with the rise of Adolf Hitler in neighboring Germany to the west of Poland and the ever-expanding Soviet Union to the east. In August 1939, Germany and the Soviet Union signed a non-aggression treaty stating that they would not attack one another if a war broke out in Europe and that they would share between them the territory of Poland. This treaty was to be known as the Molotov–Ribbentrop Pact. During World War II, diplomatic relations between Mexico and Poland never ceased. Mexico vehemently condemned the invasion and occupation of Poland by both German and Soviet troops. In May 1942, Mexico declared war on Germany and in December 1942, Polish Prime Minister Władysław Sikorski paid an official visit to Mexico and met with Mexican President Manuel Ávila Camacho. To show solidarity with the Polish people, Mexico accepted in 1943 over 2,000 Polish refugees including 1,400 Polish orphans to settle in the state of Guanajuato in central Mexico. After the war, many of the refugees remained to live in Mexico.

At the end of World War II, Mexico continued to maintain diplomatic relations with communist Poland. In 1960, both nations elevated their diplomatic missions to that of embassies. In 1963, President Adolfo López Mateos became the first Mexican head of state to visit Poland. That same year, Polish Prime Minister Józef Cyrankiewicz paid an official visit to Mexico. Diplomatic relations continued unabated even when Poland transitioned from having a communist government to a democratic one in 1989. In 1998, former Polish President Lech Wałęsa paid a visit to Mexico. Wałęsa returned to Mexico in December 2000 to attend the inauguration of President Vicente Fox.

In 2017, both nations commemorated the opening of a Polish Investment and Trade Agency office in Mexico City. In 2018, both nations celebrated 90 years of diplomatic relations.

High-level visits

High-level visits from Mexico to Poland
 President Adolfo López Mateos (1963)
 Foreign Minister Rosario Green (2000)
 President Vicente Fox (2004)
 Foreign Minister José Antonio Meade (2015)

High-level visits from Poland to Mexico
 Prime Minister Władysław Sikorski (1942)
 Prime Minister Józef Cyrankiewicz (1963)
 Chairman Henryk Jabłoński (1979)
 Prime Minister Jerzy Buzek  (1998)
 Foreign Minister Włodzimierz Cimoszewicz (2003)
 President Aleksander Kwaśniewski (2004)
 President Andrzej Duda (2017)

Bilateral relations
Both nations have signed several bilateral agreements such as a Treaty of Friendship, Commerce and Navigation (1930); Agreement on Consular Relations (1985); Agreement on Air Transportation (1990); Agreement to Avoid Double Taxation and Prevent Tax Evasion in Tax Matters (1998); Agreement on Scientific and Technical Cooperation (1998); Agreement on the establishment of Political Consultations between Mexico and Poland (1998); Agreement of Cooperation to Combat Organized Crime and other types of Crimes (2002); Agreement on Tourism Cooperation (2004); Agreement on Educational and Cultural Cooperation (2017) and an Agreement on Exportation Credit (2017).

Transportation and Tourism
LOT Polish Airlines operates seasonal charter flights between Cancún International Airport and Warsaw Chopin Airport,  Katowice International Airport and Poznań–Ławica Airport. In 2015, 35,000 Polish citizens traveled to Mexico for tourism.

Trade and Economic Relations
In 1997, Mexico signed a Free Trade Agreement with the European Union, of which Poland is a member of since joining in 2004. Since then, trade between the two nations has increased dramatically. In 2018, two-way trade between the two nations amounted to US$1.2 billion. Poland is Mexico's 47th most important trading partner globally. Mexico's main exports to Poland include: motor vehicles, tractors, cycles and other vehicles; memory units; razors; and turbojet, turboprop and gas turbines. Poland's main exports to Mexico include: motor vehicles and seats; goods for the Promotion Program of the Automotive and Auto Parts Industry Sector; and fuel pumps for diesel injection.

Between 1999 and 2012, Polish direct investment to Mexico amounted to US$17 million. During that same period, Mexican direct investment to Poland amounted to approximately US$4 million. Mexican multinational companies such as Cemex, Grupo Industrial Saltillo, Katcon, Mexichem and Nemak operate in Poland and Mexican beer and Tequila are readily found in the country. Polish Vodka and other liquors are available in Mexican all-inclusive resorts and are also sold in stores throughout the country. Polish multinational companies Boryszew and Bury Technologies operate in Mexico. Mexican cinema and Telenovelas are widely watched in Poland.

Resident diplomatic missions 
 Mexico has an embassy in Warsaw.
 Poland has an embassy in Mexico City.

See also 
 Polish Mexicans
 Mexico–EU relations

References 

 
Poland
Bilateral relations of Poland